Christos Chatziskoulidis (3 December 1952 – 19 January 2010) was a Greek footballer.

Career
Born in Piraeus, Chatziskoulidis began playing football for Apollon Renti F.C. and Atromitos Piraeus F.C. in the local Piraeus championships, but was most successful playing for Egaleo F.C., and was the second all-time scorer in the Greek second tier with 150 goals. He left Egaleo in 1985, and would play for Akratitos F.C. and other lower league clubs before retiring.

References

1952 births
2010 deaths
Egaleo F.C. players
A.P.O. Akratitos Ano Liosia players
Association football forwards
Footballers from Piraeus
Greek footballers